An ABLE account, also known as a 529 ABLE or 529A account, is a state-run savings program for eligible people with disabilities in the United States. Rules governing ABLE accounts are codified in Internal Revenue Code section 529A, which was enacted by the Achieving a Better Life Experience (ABLE) Act in 2014. With limitations, funds in an ABLE account are exempt from the Supplemental Security Income (SSI) and Medicaid asset limit, and earnings are exempt from federal income tax.

History 

Stephen E. Beck, Jr., vice chairman of the National Down Syndrome Society and the Down Syndrome Association of Northern Virginia Board of Directors, proposed a plan to help his daughter, who has Down syndrome, save money. Beck's plan became the basis for the Achieving a Better Life Experience (ABLE) Act.

The ABLE Act received broad support in Congress, with 85% of Congress signing on as cosponsors. On December 19, 2014, the ABLE Act was signed into law by President Obama.

In June 2016, Ohio, Tennessee, and Nebraska were the first three states to launch ABLE programs.

The Tax Cuts and Jobs Act of 2017 included language from the ABLE Financial Planning Act and the ABLE to Work Act. The ABLE Financial Planning Act allows rollovers from 529 plans to ABLE accounts. The ABLE to Work Act allows working beneficiaries who don't contribute to 401(k) or similar plans to make additional contributions to ABLE accounts.

As of August 2018, 39 states and the District of Columbia run ABLE programs, some of which are open to individuals nationwide.

Characteristics 

ABLE programs are similar to tax-advantaged 529 plans for college savings. In addition, a 529 plan can be rolled over into an ABLE account for a qualified beneficiary.

An ABLE account can be opened by a disabled individual who became disabled before 26 years of age. An ABLE account can receive after-tax cash contributions from any person, including its owner. Contributions in a year are limited to the federal gift tax exclusion  for that year — $17,000 in 2023. If the beneficiary works and does not contribute to a 401(a), 401(k), 403(b), or 457 plan, the beneficiary can contribute an additional amount above that limit. The additional amount is equal to the lesser of the beneficiary's annual compensation or the federal poverty level for an individual — $12,060 in 2018.

Up to $100,000 in an ABLE account is exempt from the Supplemental Security Income (SSI) asset limit. If an ABLE account larger than $100,000 stops eligibility for SSI, the owner remains eligible for Medicaid. An ABLE account can be used instead of, or together with, a supplemental needs trust, to maintain a beneficiary's eligibility for SSI.

Earnings from an ABLE account are exempt from federal income tax, and money spent from the account must be used for qualified expenses, such as education, housing, transportation, and job training. Some states make contributions to an ABLE account deductible from state income tax.

References 

Tax-advantaged savings plans in the United States
Internal Revenue Code
Disability law in the United States